Lubecke is a surname. Notable people with the surname include:
Olga Boric-Lubecke, American engineer
Victor Lubecke, American engineer

Surnames of German origin